Fenella may refer to:


People 
 Fenella Fielding (1927–2018), English actress
 Fenella Fudge (formerly Hadingham), BBC Radio newsreader
 Fenella Kernebone (born 1976), Australian radio and TV presenter
 Fenella Woolgar (born 1969), English actress
 Lady Finella (also spelled Fenella; c. 950–995), noblewoman who killed King Kenneth II

Fiction 
 The Fate of Fenella, a Victorian novel by several authors
 A character in Walter Scott's Peveril of the Peak
 The eponymous heroine of Auber's opera La Muette de Portici, who was inspired by Walter Scott's Fenella
 Fenella Melford, a character in Diana Wynne Jones's The Time of the Ghost
 The eponymous subject of the Fenella in ... children's books by David Gentleman
 An anglicization of Fionnuala, daughter of Lir in Irish mythology and Gaelic feminine given name
 Fenella the Kettle Witch, a character from Chorlton and the Wheelies
 Fenella Feverfew, a character in The Worst Witch
 Fenella Rogers (née Guteman), a young American heiress in Agatha Christie's Endless Night (novel)

Places 
 Fenella, Ontario, a community in the province of Ontario, Canada
 Fenella Beach, a beach in St Patrick's Isle

Ships 
 SS Fenella (1881), a twin-screw Packet Steamer operated by the Isle of Man Steam Packet Company
 SS Fenella (1936), a turbine steamers sunk during the Dunkirk Evacuation
 MV Fenella (1951), a motor cargo vessel operated by the Isle of Man Steam Packet Company
 MV Fenella (1986), a bulk cargo ship owned by Mineralien Schiffahrt Spedition & Transport Schnaittenbach, Germany

Other 
 Finella, a genus of sea snails in the family Scaliolidae
 Fenella (insect), a genus of sawfly in family Tenthredinidae

Scottish feminine given names